Jimmy Lung Fong (龍方) was a Hong Kong actor, film director, and action choreographer. Lung was best known to moviegoers for his frequent portrayal of villains in various Hong Kong films, most notably in films made by Wong Jing. Lung retired from the film industry, and died from lung cancer in 2008.

Career
Lung Fong was born Li Chien-Min. He started his career by playing small roles in porno's and martial arts films during the 1970s. In 1981, he left his acting career, after starring in a series of unsuccessful films.  In 1989, director Wong Jing needed someone to play a villain in Casino Raiders. While Wong had dinner at restaurant while Lung was the manager, he asked Lung for an audition. Playing the role turned out to be Lung's biggest career breakthrough, and he was nominated for a "Best New Performer" award at the Hong Kong Film Awards.

Lung left his restaurant job, and went on to play numerous other villains in the following decade. He retired from acting again in 2000 and moved to Mainland China to work as a businessman.

Death
Ming Pao Daily News quoted Lung's manager as saying he was diagnosed with terminal lung cancer in May 2008, after he saw a doctor about a persistent cough.  Lung sought treatment at the Wuhan, Hubei province of China, but by the time he was admitted to hospital in the Xi'an, Shaanxi province, he could not speak and did not leave any last words before his death.  Lung died from lung cancer at the age of 54 on 14 November 2008. A memorial service for the actor was held in Shenzhen.

Filmography

Actor

Action director
Gold Snatchers (1973)
Death Challenge (1977)
Challenge of Death (1978)
Butcher Wing (1979)

Assistant action director
The Hot, the Cool and the Vicious (1976)
Fatal Needles vs. Fatal Fists (1978)
Green Jade Statuette (1978)
Phantom Kung Fu (1978)

Director
Death Challenge (1977)

Nominations

References

External links

Lung Fong @ Hong Kong Movie Database

Hong Kong male actors
Hong Kong film directors
Hong Kong people
1954 births
2008 deaths